Josip Kušević (also spelled Joseph Kussevich, 23 May 1775 – 5 July 1846) was a Croatian politician and lawyer. He was a member of the Croatian Parliament and the Diet of Hungary. As a politician, he opposed introduction of Hungarian language in official use in Croatia. His works influenced the Illyrian movement and Kušević was held in high regard by supporters of the movement.

Biography

Early life
Kušević was born in Samobor on 23 May 1775. He attended high school in Zagreb before receiving a royal scholarship to study philosophy and law at the University of Zagreb and the Royal University of Pest. Since 1796, he worked as a lawyer in Zagreb, and in administration of the Zagreb County. He successfully argued for preservation of the Law Faculty of the Zagreb University, contesting the royal decree to abolish it in 1803. Two years later, Kušević became a notary, and was appointed to sit at the Royal Court Table. In 1808, the Croatian Parliament appointed him the prothonotary of the kingdoms of Dalmatia, Croatia and Slavonia. That position also made Kušević a member of the parliament. In 1809, during the War of the Fifth Coalition, Kušević was appointed commissioner tasked with supply of the Habsburg armed forces. After the Treaty of Schönbrunn awarded territory south of the Sava river to the French Empire (subsequently organised as the Illyrian Provinces), Kušević was appointed a member of the commission tasked with marking of the new border along the river. In 1822, Kušević and Alojzije Bužan were sent as envoys of the Zagreb County to the Congress of Verona to express gratitude to Francis I of Austria for restoring the territory south of the Sava to the kingdoms of Dalmatia, Croatia, and Slavonia.

Advocate of the Croatian state right
As a Croatian Parliament's delegate to the 1825–1827 Diet of Hungary held in Pozsony, Kušević opposed a bill introducing the Hungarian language in official use in Croatia in place of Latin in a speech held on 26 February 1826. Kušević said that the Diet had no right to decide on the language used public affairs of other realms. Even though the speech was included in the record of the Diet, Kušević was displeased with the way it was abridged and had it printed and published separately as the Sermo magistri Josephi Kussevich … protonotarii in comitiali Sessione 27. februarii 1826. pronunciatus. The Diet of Hungary appointed him in 1827 to a commission meant to compile municipal ordinances and statutes and prepare proposals for reforms of public affairs. In the work consisting of 36 articles, Kušević stated the rights supporting Croatia's special position as a state within the framework of the Lands of the Crown of Saint Stephen. The first 19 articles covered the medieval Croatian state, and the rest dealt with municipal rights of the realm. A year later, Kušević informed the Croatian Parliament he wrote the work to inform patriotic youth of their rights and distributed 500 of the 1000 printed copies to people in attendance.

Influence on the Illyrian movement
Kušević's work served as an inspiration to the nascent Croatian national revival movement. His view that the South Slavs are indigenous population, tracing their origin to the Illyrians inhabiting the Balkan Peninsula in ancient times, led him to hypothesise that there is a common South Slavic language which he referred to as the idioma Croatico-Slavico-Illyricum (Croatian-Slavic-Illyrian language). Count Janko Drašković used the same term in 1832 in his Dissertation arguing for improvement of overall circumstances of Croatia including unification of the Croatian lands commonly referred to as the Triune Kingdom of Croatia, Dalmatia and Slavonia, as well as neighbouring territories as the "Great Illyria" or "Illyric Kingdom". The Dissertation practically became the political programme of the national revival movement, and the movement itself was branded as the Illyrian movement. Kušević himself was admired by the proponents of the Croatian national revival. In 1831, Pavao Štoos dedicated his poem Nut novo leto! Mati – sin – zorja (commonly referred to as the Kip domovine vu početku leta 1831) as a great patriot.

In 1831, Kušević was appointed to the post of a royal advisor for Hungary in Vienna where he remained for the rest of his life. He died in Meidling (present-day part of Vienna) on 5 July 1846.

References

People of the Illyrian movement
Habsburg Croats
1775 births
1846 deaths
18th-century Croatian people
19th-century Croatian people
18th-century Croatian nobility
19th-century Croatian nobility